So Help Me Todd is an American legal drama television series, created by Scott Prendergast, that premiered on September 29, 2022, on CBS. The series follows a talented but directionless private investigator, who begrudgingly agrees to work at his overbearing mother's law firm. It stars Marcia Gay Harden, Skylar Astin, Madeline Wise, Tristen J. Winger, Inga Schlingmann, and Rosa Arrendondo. In February 2023, the series was renewed for a second season.

Premise
So Help Me Todd follows Todd, who has good instincts as a private investigator, but lacks direction and is the black sheep of his family.  After his strong-willed mother, Margaret, negotiated dropping criminal charges against Todd two years previously, he reluctantly agrees to work at her Portland, Oregon, law firm as an in-house investigator. Margaret believes in strictly adhering to the law, which is at complete odds with Todd's tendency to bend the law to navigate sticky situations.

Cast

 Marcia Gay Harden as Margaret, a defense attorney who completed her Juris Doctor degree after the death of her first husband, who was the father of her children
 Skylar Astin as Todd, Margaret's youngest child, a former private detective hired by Margaret's firm
 Madeline Wise as Allison, Todd's married sister, an ER doctor
 Tristen J. Winger as Lyle, a fastidious in-house investigator at Margaret's firm
 Inga Schlingmann as Susan, Todd's engaged ex-girlfriend, a lawyer at Margaret's firm
 Rosa Evangelina Arredondo as Francey, Margaret's executive assistant

Episodes

Production

Development
On February 3, 2022, it was announced that CBS had given a pilot order to an untitled mother and son legal drama from Scott Prendergast. The series is produced by Prendergast,  Dr. Phil McGraw, Jay McGraw, and Julia Eisenmann. The pilot episode was also written by Prendergast. On March 15, 2022, Liz Kruger and Craig Shapiro joined the series as showrunners and executive producers.

On May 12, 2022, it was announced that CBS had given the production, titled So Help Me Todd, a series order. It was also announced that Elizabeth Klaviter had replaced Kruger and Shapiro as the series' showrunner. On October 19, 2022, the series received a full season order. On February 2, 2023, CBS renewed the series for a second season.

Casting
In March 2022, it was announced that Geena Davis had signed on to star in the series. Shortly after, Skylar Astin was announced to star opposite her, as her son. Madeline Wise and Inga Schlingmann also joined the cast in lead roles. After having filmed the pilot, it was announced that Davis had exited the series. On March 23, 2022, it was announced that Marcia Gay Harden had replaced Davis. A few days later, it was announced that Rosa Arredondo and Tristen J. Winger had also joined the cast in series regular roles. On March 3, 2023, it was reported that Briga Heelan is set to guest star on the series' March 30 episode titled "Twelve Worried Persons".

Filming
Production on the pilot began in March 2022 in Vancouver, British Columbia. Filming for the rest of the season began on July 27, 2022, and is scheduled to conclude on April 10, 2023. A TD Bank office in downtown Vancouver serves as Margaret's law firm.

Broadcast
On May 18, 2022, CBS announced its fall broadcast schedule for the  2022-23 television season, with So Help Me Todd airing on Thursdays at 9:00PM  ET. On June 23, 2022, the series was given a September 29, 2022, premiere date. So Help Me Todd began airing on September 29, 2022, on CBS in the United States, and on  Global TV in Canada.

Reception

Critical response
The review aggregator website Rotten Tomatoes reported a 50% approval rating based on 8 critic reviews. Metacritic, which uses a weighted average, assigned a score of 51 out of 100 based on 6 critics, indicating "mixed or average reviews".

Ratings

See also
Crazy Like a Fox, a mid-1980s CBS series with a similar premise

References

External links

2020s American workplace drama television series
2020s American legal television series
2022 American television series debuts
American legal drama television series
CBS original programming
English-language television shows
Television series about families
Television series by CBS Studios
Television shows set in Portland, Oregon